Hamzehlu-ye Sofla (also Romanized as Ḩamzehlū-ye Soflá and Hamzehloo Sofla; also known as Ḩamzehlū and Ḩamzehlū-ye Pā’īn) is a village in Kamazan-e Vosta Rural District, Zand District, Malayer County, Hamadan Province, Iran. At the 2006 census, its population was 182, in 46 families.

References 

Populated places in Malayer County